David Zitelli (born 30 October 1968) is a French former professional footballer who played as a striker. While at Strasbourg he won the Coupe de la Ligue in 1997, playing in the final.

References

External links
 
 
 
 Profile at racingstub.com

Living people
1968 births
Sportspeople from Meurthe-et-Moselle
French footballers
Association football forwards
AS Nancy Lorraine players
FC Metz players
RC Strasbourg Alsace players
Karlsruher SC players
Hibernian F.C. players
FC Istres players
Ligue 1 players
Ligue 2 players
Scottish Premier League players
French expatriate footballers
French expatriate sportspeople in Germany
Expatriate footballers in Germany
French expatriate sportspeople in Scotland
Expatriate footballers in Scotland
Footballers from Grand Est